Andrew McLean may refer to:

 Andrew Young McLean (1909–1988), Canadian newspaper publisher and politician
 Andrew McLean (American politician) (active since 2012), American politician from Maine
 Andrew McLean (footballer) (born 1973), Australian rules footballer
 Andrew McLean (tennis) (born 1969), Australian tennis player
 Andrew McLean (boxer) (born 1976), English boxer
 Andrew McLean (cyclist) (born 1966), South African road cyclist
 Andrew McLean (rugby union) (1898–1964), New Zealand rugby union player and All Black
 Andrew MacLean (comics) (active since 2013)

See also 
Andrew Stuart McLean (1948–2017), Canadian humorist and author